Horace Bolingbroke Woodward , (20 August 1848 – 6 February 1914) was a British geologist who participated in the Geological Survey of England and Wales from 1867 until his retirement in 1908. He was vice-president of the Geological Society, where he was elected a Fellow in 1868; elected a Fellow of the Royal Society in 1896, and awarded the Wollaston Medal in 1909.

He was second son of geologist Samuel Pickworth Woodward, himself second son of geologist and antiquary Samuel Woodward. His brother was malacologist Bernard Barham Woodward.

Selected works

References

1848 births
1914 deaths
English geologists
Fellows of the Royal Society
Wollaston Medal winners
Fellows of the Geological Society of London
Presidents of the Geologists' Association
Presidents of the Geological Society of London